Applebrook Golf Club is a golf course just outside Malvern, Pennsylvania. It was designed by Gil Hanse. Its rating is 73.7 for the black tee.

History and design
The Applebrook Golf Club is located on the property of the former Applebrook Farm, which was deeded by William Penn to Robert Williams in 1702. The golf course was designed by Gil Hanse in 2000 and opened the following year. Applebrook's Performance Center, an 1800-square-foot indoor/outdoor practice facility, opened in 2018.

The course features four par-five holes within the first 522 yards. The ninth and eighteenth holes feature the "quarry", a sandy area that offers views of the entire course. Suburban Life Magazine called Applebrook "one of the most compelling courses around" that "combines natural beauty with plenty of water hazards, nasty bunkers and quick fairways."

In 2019, Applebrook hosted the GAP Patterson Cup. Applebrook was ranked the 14th best golf course in Pennsylvania by Golf Digest.

Scorecard

References

External links 
Official Site

Buildings and structures in Chester County, Pennsylvania
Golf clubs and courses in Pennsylvania
2001 establishments in Pennsylvania
Sports venues completed in 2001